Amung or Amungme may refer to:
Amung people, a people of the Papua province of Indonesia
Amung language, the language of the Amung people